Oriol Pla Solina (born 1993) is a Spanish actor from Catalonia.

Biography 
Oriol Pla Solina was born in Barcelona in 1993, son to Quimet Pla (founding member of ) and Núria Solina (founding member of ). He made his debut onstage at age 6, later founding his own clown group 'Espai Dual'. In his early television career, he featured in TV3 shows such as El cor de la ciutat, the TV-movie  or Merlí.

Filmography

Television

Film

Accolades

References 

21st-century Spanish male actors
Spanish male television actors
Spanish male film actors
Male actors from Barcelona
1993 births
Living people